Josef Bělka (20 February 1886 – 14 March 1944) was a Czech footballer who played as a forward.

Club career
Bělka began his career at Sparta Prague, playing for the club for two seasons, before joining rivals Slavia Prague in 1907. On 13 October 1907, in his first game against his old club, Bělka scored twice for Slavia in a 2–2 draw against Sparta Prague. Just over a month later, on 24 November 1907, Bělka scored five times for Slavia in a 9–1 derby win away to Sparta Prague. Despite his good early form at Slavia Prague, Bělka could not displace striker Jan Košek and on 31 December 1909, Bělka requested a transfer back to Sparta Prague.

In 1912, Bělka won his first league title with Sparta Prague, however on 31 December 1912, Bělka sought out Slavia Prague manager Jake Madden, asking to return to the club as Košek was coming to the end of his career. Bělka subsequently returned to Slavia, winning the league title in his first season back at the club. Bělka was used as the main striker for Slavia in his second spell at the club, winning two more league titles in 1915 and 1918, before his retirement from playing at the age of 32 in the autumn of 1918. Upon his retirement, Bělka's place in the Slavia squad was taken by Jan Vaník. Throughout his career at Slavia Prague, Josef played 428 games and scored 422 goals.

International career
On 7 April 1907, Bělka made his debut for Bohemia in a 5–2 loss against Hungary. On 6 October 1907, in his second cap for Bohemia, Bělka scored his first goals for Bohemia in a 5–3 win against Hungary. In total, Bělka made four appearances for Bohemia, scoring four times.

International goals
Scores and results list Bohemia's goal tally first.

Managerial career
In 1925, upon the formation of the professional Czechoslovak First League, Bělka was appointed manager of Viktoria Žižkov. In 1927, Bělka departed Viktoria Žižkov, leaving football.

References

1886 births
1944 deaths
People from Prague-East District
Association football forwards
Czech footballers
Czechoslovak footballers
AC Sparta Prague players
SK Slavia Prague players
Bohemia international footballers
FK Viktoria Žižkov managers
Czechoslovak football managers
Czech football managers
Sportspeople from the Central Bohemian Region